Mark V. Campbell (born 1978) is a Canadian academic, disc jockey and writer. He was raised in Scarborough, a suburb of Toronto, Canada. Currently, he is an assistant professor and Associate Chair of the Department of Arts, Culture and Media, University of Toronto Scarborough. He is the founder of the Northside Hip Hop Archive, an online archive that digitizes oral histories, event flyers, posters and analog recordings that document the beginnings of Canadian hip hop. Campbell is the 2020-21 Jackman Humanities Institute UTSC Fellow and a Connaught Early Career Fellow at the University of Toronto. Campbell was formerly Director of FCAD Forum for Cultural Strategies and adjunct professor at the RTA School of Media, Ryerson University.

Campbell was a Banting postdoctoral fellow in the Department of Fine Arts at the University of Regina. He is a fellow and former postdoctoral fellow with the International Institute for Critical Studies in Improvisation. Campbell became a disc jockey in 1994 and co-hosted the Bigger than Hip-Hop Show on community radio from 1997 to 2015.

Campbell's work focuses on new modalities of being human, sonic innovations within Black music, and the knowledge production of digital archives.

Work 
Campbell published Afrosonic Life in 2022 which focuses on “the role sonic innovations in the African diaspora play in articulating methodologies for living the afterlife of slavery.”

In 2010, he founded the Northside Hip Hop Archive, aiming to preserve the history of Canada's hip hop community's beginnings in the 1980s and 1990s.

Campbell has curated several exhibitions of Canadian hip-hop archival material: Still Tho: Aesthetic Survival in Hip Hop's Visual Art at Âjagemô art space at the Canada Council for the Arts; ...Everything Remains Raw: Photographing Toronto’s Hip Hop Culture from Analogue to Digital at the McMichael Art Collection,; For the Record: ‘An Idea of the North’ at the TD Gallery at the Toronto Reference Library; Mixtapes: Hip Hop’s Lost Archive at Gallery 918; T-Dot Pioneers 3.0: The Future Must be Replenished at Soho Lobby Gallery; T-Dot Pioneers 2011: The Glenn Gould Remix at the Glenn Gould Studio at CBC Radio; T-Dot Pioneers 2010 at the Toronto Free Gallery.

Selected publications 

 2022: Afrosonic Life, Bloomsbury Academic
 2020: (Co-Editor) We Still Here: Hip Hop North of the 49th Parallel, McGill-Queen's University Press
 2018: ...Everything Remains Raw: Photographing Toronto hip hop Culture from Analogue to Digital, Goose Lanes Edition

References 

Living people
Canadian academics
1978 births
Canadian DJs
Canadian male non-fiction writers